Algeciras Gate was a city gate in the British Overseas Territory of Gibraltar. It was located on the site of what later became King's Bastion

References

City gates in Gibraltar